The Guang Hua Digital Plaza is a six-story, indoor technological and electronics market located in Taipei, Taiwan. It is located at the intersection of the Zhongzheng and Daan Districts.

History 
Guang Hua Market was established by the Taipei City Government in April 1973 as a retailer market, using the space beneath the old Guanghua Bridge. Originally, the market specialized in old books, giving it the nickname "old books street". Within a decade, however, electronics retailers gained presence in the market and surrounding streets.

Due to underground railroad construction in 1992, Guang Hua Market was moved to an underground location at the corner of Bade Road and Xinsheng South Road. By this time, the area became known for electronics, with many new stores opening, and the establishment of other electronic markets such as the International Electronics Market, Contemporary Life Market, and Sanpu Market.

In 2006 due to the demolition of the Guanghua Bridge, Guang Hua Market was moved to a temporary location at the corner of Jinshan North Road and Civic Boulevard. The temporary building consisted of five warehouse-like halls, providing a total of 196 retail stores. Not soon after market moved into its temporary location, construction began on the current six-story Guang Hua Digital Plaza building, which has been its current location since July 2008.

Overview
The Guang Hua Digital Plaza building today consists of six stories above ground and one story below ground. The first story above ground is an exhibition space for electronic products. The second and third stories are the new locations for the 196 vendors of the original Guang Hua Market. The fourth and fifth stories are the new locations for the vendors of Xining Guozhai Electronics Market. The sixth floor is reserved for repair shops, education classes, and offices. The basement floor is parking. The market attracts tens of thousands of visitors each day.

It is located on the corner of Xinsheng North Road and Civic Boulevard and is accessible from MRT Zhongxiao Xinsheng Station. The surrounding area and streets are also full of shops selling electronics. Large companies, including Microsoft and Intel, regularly unveil products at Guang Hua Digital Plaza.

Future Developments
The area around Guang Hua Plaza is currently being utilized as parking space. However, the city government plans to build the "Taipei Information Park" in the surrounding area to complement the current electronics plaza. The new park will be built at the intersection of Civic Boulevard and Jinshan South Road. The park will also include hotel rooms, offices, and restaurants.

On April 27, 2010, the build-operate-transfer (BOT) project was awarded to the Hon Hai Group, beating out four other bidders. Syntrend Creative Park, which opened in May 2015, features a technology exhibition center, digital entertainment zone, and business cultivation center.

References

1973 establishments in Taiwan
Electronics districts
Retail markets in Taiwan
Shopping malls established in 1973
Shopping malls in Taipei